Matthew Carl Lamanna is a paleontologist and the assistant curator of vertebrate paleontology at the Carnegie Museum of Natural History, where he oversees the dinosaur collection.

Education
Lamanna graduated from Hobart College in Geneva, New York in 1997.  He received high honors in biology and geology.  Lamanna went on to get his M.A. and Ph.D. in earth and environmental science from the University of Pennsylvania.

Discoveries
Lamanna first gained fame for the 2000 discovery of Paralititan in Egypt, called by some as the "largest dinosaur ever discovered".  The sauropod was 80 feet long and weighed between 40 and 50 tons.  The discovery was the feature of a 2-hour A&E documentary The Lost Dinosaurs of Egypt.

Beginning in 2004, Lamanna began work on a series of digs in China.  The result, first published in the journal Science in June 2006, was the discovery of Gansus yumenensis, a missing link in the early evolution of birds.

External links
Lamanna's CV at Carnegie Museum
Lamanna’s biography at Carnegie Museum 
“Remarkable Alum” entry at Hobart and William Smith Colleges website
Ancestor of Modern Birds Believed Found – The Washington Post
Ducklike Fossil Points to Aquatic Origins for Modern Birds – Scientific American

American paleontologists
Year of birth missing (living people)
Living people
 
Scientists from New York (state)
University of Pennsylvania alumni
Hobart and William Smith Colleges alumni
Waterloo, New York